This is a list of the Duchesses, Electresses and Queens of Saxony; the consorts of the Duke of Saxony and its successor states; including the Electorate of Saxony, the Kingdom of Saxony, the House of Ascania, Albertine, and the Ernestine Saxony.

Ducal Saxony

Duchess of Saxony 
 ? – 800: Geva of Westfold, wife of Widukind, daughter of the Danish king Goimo I and sister of the Danish kings Ragnar and Siegfried, d. a. 800

Ascanian Ducal Saxony

Duchess of Saxe-Lauenburg

Duchess of Saxe-Wittenberg

Saxe-Meißen, incorporating Saxe-Wittenberg in 1547

Saxe-Thuringia, including Saxe-Wittenberg until 1547

Electorate of Saxony

Electress of Saxony 
See: Electresses of Saxony.

Albertine Ducal Saxony

Duchess of Saxe-Weissenfels

Duchess of Saxe-Merseburg

Duchess of Saxe-Zeitz

Ernestine Saxony

Duchess of Saxe-Weimar

Duchess of Saxe-Coburg-Eisenach

Duchess of Saxe-Coburg

Duchess of Saxe-Eisenach

Duchess of Saxe-Altenburg

Duchess of Saxe-Gotha

Duchess of Saxe-Gotha-Altenburg

Duchess of Saxe-Marksuhl

Duchess of Saxe-Jena

Duchess of Saxe-Eisenberg

Duchess of Saxe-Hildburghausen

Duchess of Saxe-Römhild

Duchess of Saxe-Saalfeld

Duchess of Saxe-Meiningen

Duchess of Saxe-Coburg-Saalfeld

Duchess of Saxe-Coburg and Gotha

Duchess of Saxe-Weimar-Eisenach

Grand Duchess of Saxe-Weimar-Eisenach

Royal Saxony

Queen of Saxony

References 

Consorts
 
 
 
 
 
 
 
 
 
 
 
 
 
 
 
 
 
 
 
 
 
 
 
 
 
 
 
Saxony
Saxony
Consort
Consort
Saxon consorts
Saxon duchesses consort
Saxony